is a Japanese football player. He plays for Thespakusatsu Gunma.

Career
Shunta Shimura joined J2 League club Thespakusatsu Gunma in 2016.

Club statistics
Updated to 22 February 2018.

References

External links 

Profile at Thespakusatsu Gunma

1997 births
Living people
Association football people from Gunma Prefecture
Japanese footballers
J2 League players
J3 League players
Thespakusatsu Gunma players
Association football midfielders